Dhruva Sarja (born 6 October 1988) is an Indian actor who appears in Kannada films. He made his acting debut in the 2012 film, Addhuri.

Career
Sarja debuted in films with the 2012 film Addhuri. His portrayal of Arjun as the male lead, opposite Radhika Pandit, received praise from critics. He signed for his next film Bahaddur with his close friend Chethan Kumar in 2013. The film became commercially successful and in April 2015 he signed for Bharjari. His next film has been tilted Pogaru.

A. Harsha and Sarja are also in talks for a movie.

Personal life
Dhruva Sarja's brother Chiranjeevi Sarja, who was also an actor in Kannada films, died on 7 June 2020. Their maternal uncle Arjun Sarja is a South Indian actor, and their grandfather Shakti Prasad was also an actor in Kannada films. 

Dhruva Sarja got engaged to his childhood friend Prerana on 9 December 2018. They married on 25 November 2019.

Filmography

Awards and nominations

References

External links 

1988 births
Living people
Male actors from Bangalore
Male actors in Kannada cinema
Indian male film actors
21st-century Indian male actors
South Indian International Movie Awards winners